Igort (born Igor Tuveri; September 26, 1958) is an Italian comics artist, illustrator, script writer, and film director.

Biography 

He began his career in Bologna at the end of the seventies, collaborating with numerous magazines: including Linus, Alter, Frigidaire, Métal Hurlant, L'Écho des savanes, Vanity, The Face. Since the nineties, he collaborates with the Japanese publishing houses Kodansha, Brutus and Hon Hon do.

In 1994 he exhibited his works at the Venice Biennale.

In 2000 he founded the Coconino Press publishing house.

In 2002 he publishes 5 is the perfect number, a Neapolitan noir, that he began drawing in Tokyo and completed after about 10 years of processing and rewriting. The book, labeled Coconino Press, came out simultaneously in 6 countries and won the Book of the Year Award at the Frankfurt Book Fair. It is Igort's most popular book to date.

Fats Waller will follow, an imaginative biography of one of the most popular Jazz musicians of the Thirties, in collaboration with the Argentine writer and screenwriter, Carlos Sampayo. Igort's work begins to spread further abroad. He moved to Paris and began the Baobab series, which tells the parallel lives of a Japanese boy (Hiroshi Oolong) and a young South American (Celestino Villarosa). Baobab series comes out simultaneously in Italy, France, Spain, Holland, Germany and the United States.

In 2010, after a long residence, between Ukraine, Russia and Siberia, Igort writes and draws Ukrainian Notebooks, published in the Strade Blu series of Mondadori.

In 2011 he published Russian Notebooks, drawn following a report by the Russian journalist Anna Politkovskaja. The volume Pagine nomadi (Nomadic pages) follows, its publication coincides with the large exhibition dedicated to graphic journalism hosted at the Milan Triennale.

In 2013 he starred in the documentary Igort, the secret landscape, by director Domenico Distilo which illustrates the research carried out for the trilogy on the Soviet Union, the birth of the graphic novel and its relationship with the story through images.

In the last half of 2014, Igort announces on his personal Facebook page the publication of his next work, Japanese notebooks, a memoir, comic essay, travel book and drawn reportage that tells the author's years spent in Japan. In December of the same year Nostalgia is published, a book which is a preview of a work to be published.
In November 2016, the novel My Generation comes out, which tells about the Punk and New Wave era. In the same month he released Gli assalti alle panetterie (Assaults to the bakeries), a volume written by Haruki Murakami that Igort illustrated with watercolors.

On 21 February 2017 Igort announces on Facebook that he leaves Coconino Press because he is no longer able to do his job there serenely.

In 2019, Igort directed the live action adaptation of 5 is the Perfect Number, starring Toni Servillo and Valeria Golino.

Main works

In English
 Dulled Feelings
 Baobab 1
 Baobab 2
 Baobab 3
 5 is the Perfect Number
 Fats Waller
 The Ukrainian and Russian Notebooks
 Japanese Notebooks

In Italian 
 Goodbye Baobab, with Daniele Brolli, Rizzoli 1984
 That's all Folks. Granata Press, 1993
 Il letargo dei sentimenti. Granata Press, 1993
 Cartoon Aristocracy. Carbone, 1994
 Perfetti e invisibili. Skirà, 1996
 Yuri. Kodansha, 1996
 Brillo: i segreti del bosco antico. De Agostini, 1997 (CD ROM)
 Sinatra. Coconino Press, 2000
 City lights, Coconino Press, 2001
 Maccaroni Circus, Cut up 2001
 5 è il Numero Perfetto. Coconino Press, 2002
 Il letargo dei Sentimenti. Coconino Press, 2002
 5 Variations. John Belushi, 2002
 Brillo Croniche di Fafifurnia. Coconino Press, 2003
 Yuri, Asa Nisi masa. Coconino Press, 2003
 Fats Waller. Con Carlos Sampayo. Coconino Press, 2004
 Baobab 1. Coconino press, 2005
 Baobab 2. Coconino press, 2006
 Storyteller. Coconino Press, 2007
 Dimmi che non vuoi morire. With Massimo Carlotto. Mondadori 2007
 Casinò. Nocturne, 2007 (CD)
 Baobab 3. Coconino press, 2008
 Quaderni ucraini. Mondadori, 2010
 Parola di Chandler. With Raymond Chandler. Coconino Press, 2011
 Quaderni russi. Mondadori, 2011
 Pagine Nomadi, storie non ufficiali dell'Unione Sovietica. Coconino Press 2012
 Sinfonia a Bombay. Coconino Press 2013
 Quaderni ucraini, Coconino Press, 2014
 Quaderni Russi Nuova edizione, Coconino Press, 2014
 Nostalgia, Edizioni Oblomov, 2014
 Quaderni giapponesi, Coconino Press, 2015
 My Generation. Chiarelettere 2016
 Gli assalti alle panetterie. Einaudi 2016
 Ishiki no kashi. Oblomov 2017
 Quaderni Giapponesi vol 2 - Il vagabondo del manga. Oblomov 2017

In French 
La lethargie des sentiments. Albin Michel 1987

L'enfer des desirs Les Humanos 1989.

Sinatra. Amok 2000

5 est le numero parfait. Casterman 2002

 La Ballade de Hambone. Tome 1 With Leila Marzocchi. Futuropolis 2009

 La ballade de Hambone. Tome 2 With Leila Marzocchi. Futuropolis 2010
 
Les Cahiers Ukrainiens. Futuropolis 2010

Les cahiers russes. Futuropolis 2012

Les Cahiers Japonais. Futuropolis 2015

Les cahiers Japonais tome 2. Futuropolis 2017

Les Cahiers Japonais tome 3. Futuropolis 2020

Encre sur papier. Ici Meme 2021

Kokoro – Le Son caché des choses. Ici Meme 2021

 Gauloises. With Andrea Serio. Futuropolis 2022

Journal d'une invasione. Futuropolis 2023

Awards 
 2017 Prize Golden Romics to career at XXI Edition of Romics.
 2016 Winner of the "Premio Napoli" in Naples for the diffusion of italian culture in the world.
 2016 Winner of the "Best artist" award at Naples' comic Festival. Comicon 2016 for "Quaderni Giapponesi".
 2016 Winner of the "Author of the year" award in Lucca Comics Festival. 2016 for "Quaderni Giapponesi".
 2013 Winner of "Mostra Internazionale dei Cartoonists" award in Rapallo, 2013, as best realistic artist.
 2013 Winner of the "Best script " award for the "Cahiers russes" in Pibrac. Prix lycéen de la BD.
 2012 Winner of the "Book of the year" award in Naples comic Festival. Comicon 2012 for "Quaderni Russi"
 2012 Winner of the "Book of the year" award. Prix Region Centre. In Blois comic Festival.Comicon 2012 for "Les Caihers Russes"
 2011 Winner of the "Prize in memory of Holodomor" in Paris, November 2011 for "Les cahiers Ukrainiens"
 2011 Special prize at Napoli Comicon for Quaderni Ucraini
 2007 Prize Italia Criminale at Treviso Comics for  Dimmi che non vuoi morire
 2006 Prize Best book of the year at Napoli Comicon for Fats Waller
 2005 Winner of International event of the year award at Treviso Comics for Fats Waller
 2004 Prize Lo straniero al Negroamaro festival (Lecce)
 2004 Prize  "libro jazz dell'anno" per Fats Waller al jazz festival "Swing a Xirocourt"
 2003 Prize Best book of the year at Frankfurt Bookfair for 5 is the perfect number
 2003 Prize Coccobill: best author at Milan comics festival Cartoomics
 2003 Special prize  A.N.A.F.I. (Associazione Nazionale Amici Fumetto Italiano)
 2003 Grand prize at Romics for 5 è il numero perfetto 
 2002 Prize Pulcinella at Naples Comicon

References

External links

 
 
 

1958 births
Igort
People from Cagliari
Living people
Italian film directors
Italian screenwriters